Korogwe is a town in Tanzania, with a population of 56,282 in 2012.  It is the main centre of Korogwe District, which is within the Tanga Region.

Overview
The town is the seat of the Anglican Diocese of Tanga and has a cathedral church dedicated to St. Michael and All Angels. It also has a teacher training college and a number of secondary schools.

The district is drained by tributaries of the Pangani River.

Health care
The Magunga district hospital is the home of the NIMR Korogwe Research Laboratory. The building was designed by the Danish architect Jakob Knudsen (see also picture below). Great effort was taken to adapt the building to local environment and climate. The building was officially opened on 19 September 2008 and has since been used to support malaria vaccine trials.

Transport

Road
Korogwe is a road and rail junction, where the routes from Tanga link those from Dar es Salaam to the northern cities of Arusha and Moshi.

References

Korogwe District Homepage for the 2002 Tanzania National Census

External links
The Charity Devon Aid - Korogwe ( DAK )

Populated places in Tanga Region